The following low-power television stations broadcast on digital or analog channel 3 in the United States:

 K03AY-D in Ridgway, etc., Colorado
 K03CM-D in Pioche, Nevada
 K03CS-D in Broadus, Montana
 K03DJ-D in Polson, Montana
 K03DP-D in Scobey, Montana
 K03DS-D in Ruth, Nevada
 K03DT-D in Superior, Montana
 K03ET-D in Terrace Lakes, Idaho
 K03EY-D in Parlin, Colorado
 K03FB-D in Snowflake, etc., Arizona
 K03FW-D in Kenai, etc., Alaska
 K03GA-D in Elim, Alaska
 K03GL-D in King Mountain, etc., Alaska
 K03HD-D in Plevna, Montana
 K03HX-D in Etna, California
 K03IA-D in Sula, Montana
 K03II-D in Manhattan, Kansas
 K03IJ-D in College Station, Texas
 K03IL-D in Bullhead City, Arizona
 K03IM-D in Eugene, Oregon
 K03IN-D in Leavenworth, Washington
 K03IW-D in Cedar Canyon, Utah
 K03IZ-D in Salinas, California
 K03JD-D in Wendover, Utah
 K03JE-D in Victoria, Texas
 K12PO in Temecula, California
 K20KE-D in Denver, Colorado
 KCNL-LD in Reno, Nevada
 KCSO-LD in Sacramento, California
 KLAO-LD in Corpus Christi, Texas
 KODF-LD in Dallas, Texas
 KSGA-LD in Los Angeles, California
 KURK-LD in Santa Rosa, California/San Francisco, California
 KVHD-LD in Los Angeles, California, uses KSGA-LD's spectrum
 KXVU-LD in Chico, California
 KZHO-LD in Houston, Texas
 W03AK-D in Ela, etc., North Carolina
 W03AM-D in Harrison, Maine
 W03BU-D in Matecumbe, Florida
 W03BW-D in Midland City, Alabama
 W03BX-D in Sutton, West Virginia
 WCBI-LD in Starkville, Mississippi
 WDVZ-CD in Greensboro, Alabama
 WHNE-LD in Detroit, Michigan
 WNWT-LD in New York, New York, uses WJLP's full-power spectrum
 WOME-LD in Orlando, Florida
 WRZH-LP in Red Lion-Harrisburg, Pennsylvania
 WTHC-LD in Atlanta, Georgia
 WWWB-LD in Clarkrange, Tennessee
 WZNA-LD in Guaynabo, Puerto Rico

The following low-power stations, which are no longer licensed, formerly broadcast on analog or digital channel 3:
 K03AL in Toquerville, Utah
 K03AO in Manitou Springs, Colorado
 K03AS in Richfield, etc., Utah
 K03BF in Enterprise, Utah
 K03CN in Duchesne, Utah
 K03CR in Big Laramie, etc., Wyoming
 K03CT in Lewiston, etc., California
 K03DE in Fish Lake Resort, Utah
 K03DI-D in Chelan Butte, Washington
 K03DO in Hoehne, Colorado
 K03EK in Newberry Springs, California
 K03FF in Koosharem, Utah
 K03FJ in Gakona, etc., Alaska
 K03FM-D in Haines, Alaska
 K03FO in Seward, Alaska
 K03FR in La Veta, Colorado
 K03FU in Mountain Gate, etc., California
 K03GK in McKinley Park, Alaska
 K03GO in Circle Hot Springs, Alaska
 K03GP-D in Sheldon Point, Alaska
 K03GX in Mountain View, Wyoming
 K03HQ in Samak, Utah
 K03HY-D in San Francisco, California
 K03IR-D in Bakersfield, California
 K03IS-D in Sioux City, Iowa
 K03IU-D in San Bernardino, California
 KEAP-LP in Eagle Pass, Texas
 KHPK-LD in De Soto, Texas
 KVTU-LD in Agoura Hills, California
 W03AO in Madison, Florida
 WBCF-LP in Florence, Alabama

References

03 low-power